This is the discography of American rap duo Ying Yang Twins.

Albums

Studio albums

Compilation albums

Mixtapes

Singles

As lead artist

As featured performer

Guest appearances
2002: "Drop A Little Lower" (Baby D featuring Ying Yang Twins) 
2003: "(I Got That) Boom Boom" (Britney Spears featuring Ying Yang Twins)
2003: "Shawty Thick" (Ice Mone featuring Ying Yang Twins) 
2003 "Get Crunk Shorty" (Nick Cannon featuring Ying Yang Twins & Fatman Scoop) 
2004: "Slow Motion (Remix)" (Juvenile featuring Wyclef Jean & Ying Yang Twins) 
2004: "Down wit da South" (Trick Daddy featuring Trina, Ying Yang Twins & Deuce Komradz) 
2004: "Stick Dat Thang Out (Skeezer)" (Lil Jon featuring Pharrell & Ying Yang Twins)
2004: "(I Got That) Boom Boom" (Collipark Remix) (Britney Spears featuring Ying Yang Twins)
2006: "Money Machine" (Nashawn featuring Nas, Jungle & Ying Yang Twins) 
2008: "Sweep Da Flo" (Unk featuring Ying Yang Twins) 
2010: "Ride Da D" (Lil Jon featuring Ying Yang Twins) 
2013: "How We Party" (Tex James featuring Ying Yang Twins)
2013: "Smart Girl" (Remix) (Tex James featuring B.o.B, Stuey Rock & Ying Yang Twins)
2014: "Thirsty" (Pastor Troy featuring La Chat & Ying Yang Twins) 
2016: "Badonk" (Pouya featuring Ying Yang Twins)
2018: "Left Right Left" (Mickie James featuring Ying Yang Twins) 
2021: "Body Move (Remix)"  (Dizzy Fae featuring Ying Yang Twins)

References

Discographies of American artists
Hip hop discographies